Cinecittà Studios (Italian for Cinema City Studios), is a large film studio in Rome, Italy. With an area of 400,000 square metres (99 acres), it is the largest film studio in Europe, and is considered the hub of Italian cinema. The studios were constructed during the Fascist era as part of a plan to revive the Italian film industry.

Filmmakers such as Federico Fellini, Roberto Rossellini, Luchino Visconti, Sergio Leone, Bernardo Bertolucci, Francis Ford Coppola, Martin Scorsese, and Mel Gibson have worked at Cinecittà. More than 3,000 movies have been filmed there, of which 90 received an Academy Award nomination and 47 of these won it. In the 1950s, the number of international productions being made there led to Rome being dubbed "Hollywood on the Tiber."

History

The studios were founded in 1937 by Benito Mussolini, his son Vittorio, and his head of cinema Luigi Freddi under the slogan "Il cinema è l'arma più forte" ("Cinema is the most powerful weapon"). The purpose was not only for propaganda, but also to support the recovering Italian feature film industry, which had reached its low point in 1931. Mussolini himself inaugurated the studios on 21 April 1937. Post-production units and sets were constructed and heavily used initially. Early films such as Scipio Africanus (1937) and The Iron Crown (1941) showcased the technological advancement of the studios. Seven thousand people were involved in the filming of the battle scene from Scipio Africanus, and live elephants were brought in as a part of the re-enactment of the Battle of Zama.

The studios were bombed by the Western Allies during the bombing of Rome in World War II. Following the war, between 1945 and 1947, the studios of Cinecittà were used as a displaced persons' camp for a period of about two years, following German occupation and Allied bombing that destroyed parts of the studio. An estimated 3,000 refugees lived there, divided into two camps: an Italian camp housing Italians as well as displaced people from Italian Libya and Dalmatia, and an international camp, including refugees from Yugoslavia, Poland, Egypt, Iran, and China.

After rebuilding in the postwar years, the studios were used once again for their post-production facilities. In the 1950s, Cinecittà, described as Hollywood on the Tiber, was the location for several large American film productions, like Roman Holiday (1953), Beat the Devil (1953), The Barefoot Contessa (1954), Ben-Hur (1959), and some low-budget action pictures starring Lex Barker. Barker also featured in Federico Fellini's La Dolce Vita (1960) and the studios were for many years closely associated with Fellini.

In the same period, the studios were used for further international productions such as Francis of Assisi (1961), Cleopatra (1963), The Agony and the Ecstasy (1965), Zeffirelli's Romeo and Juliet (1968), Fellini's Casanova (1976), La Traviata (1982) and many other productions.

It hosted the Eurovision Song Contest 1991. This was the 36th Eurovision Song Contest and was held on Stage 15. Due to the Gulf War and mounting tensions in Yugoslavia, RAI decided to move the contest from Sanremo to Rome which was perceived to be more secure.

After a period of near-bankruptcy, the Italian Government privatized Cinecittà in 1997, selling an 80% stake. On August 9, 2007, a fire destroyed about 3,000 m² (32,000 sq. ft.) of the Cinecittà lot and surroundings. The historic part that houses the sets of classics such as Ben-Hur was not damaged; however, a good portion of the original sets from the HBO/BBC series Rome was destroyed. In July 2012, another fire damaged Teatro 5, the vast studio where Fellini filmed La Dolce Vita and Satyricon (1969). A third fire in August 2022 destroyed part of a partially dismantled set depicting Renaissance-era Florence and disrupted filming of the sequel to The Old Guard.

Since the 1990s, films have included Anthony Minghella's The English Patient (1996), Martin Scorsese's Gangs of New York (2002), Wes Anderson's The Life Aquatic with Steve Zissou (2004) and Mel Gibson’s The Passion of the Christ (2004).

Notable TV productions

Cinecittà also hosts TV productions, such as Grande Fratello, the Italian version of Big Brother, where the Big Brother house is built on Cinecittà's premises. The complex also hosted the Eurovision Song Contest 1991.

In addition, the BBC/HBO series Rome was filmed there from 2004 to 2007, the show being widely acclaimed for its sets and designs. BBC Wales reused some of these sets for an episode of the 2008 series of Doctor Who set in ancient Pompeii, and Alexandre Astier reused this set for the Book VI of his television series Kaamelott set in Ancient Rome.

More recently, Paolo Sorrentino's series The Young Pope and The New Pope were almost entirely shot at Cinecittà, including reconstruction of the interiors of the Sistine Chapel and Saint Peter's Basilica. The 2019 film The Two Popes sections of which were also shot at Cinecittà, again utilised a reconstruction of the Sistine Chapel.

Cinecittà World

In 2009 the studio announced that they intended to create a theme park. The movie-themed amusement park, Cinecittà World, opened in July 2014. The €250 million theme park is located approximately 25 km (16 mi) southwest of Cinecittà studios, on the site of a former movie studio built by Dino De Laurentiis in the 1960s.

Cinecittà World was designed by Dante Ferretti, a production designer who has won three Academy Awards. Visitors enter Cinecittà World through the jaws of the Temple of Moloch, seen in Cabiria, a silent movie filmed in Turin in 1914. The theme park also features a recreation of 1920s-era Manhattan as envisioned by Ferretti.

Cinecittà World expects to have 1.5 million visitors annually. Expansion plans for the theme park include a nature reserve and a wellness center.

Gallery

See also

 Cinecittà metro station

References

External links

 
 History of Cinecittà
 RAI International:Cinecittà
 Documents Cinecitta' 

Italian film studios
Cinema of Rome
Subdivisions of Rome
Film production districts
Government-owned companies of Italy
State-owned film companies
Entertainment companies established in 1937
Mass media companies established in 1937
Italian companies established in 1937
Film production companies of Italy
Rome Q. XXIV Don Bosco
Italian fascist architecture